Mahmudabad-e Seh Dang (also Romanized as Maḩmūdābād-e Seh Dāng; also known as Mahmood Abade Seh Dangeh and Maḩmūdābād-e Seh Dāngeh) is a village in Tasuj Rural District, in the Central District of Kavar County, Fars Province, Iran. At the 2006 census, its population was 883, in 205 families.

References 

Populated places in Kavar County